Rhydymwyn railway station was a station in Rhydymwyn, Flintshire, Wales. The station was opened on 6 September 1869, closed to passengers on 30 April 1962 and closed completely on 4 May 1964. Today the station buildings are still extant although the track bed between the platforms has been infilled. Crossing gates can still be found in undergrowth.

References

Further reading

Disused railway stations in Flintshire
Railway stations in Great Britain opened in 1869
Railway stations in Great Britain closed in 1964
Former London and North Western Railway stations